Birdy is the first soundtrack and sixth album overall by the English rock musician Peter Gabriel, for the movie of the same name, released in 1985. The album marked Gabriel's first work with producer Daniel Lanois. It was remastered with most of Gabriel's catalogue in 2002.

In addition to composing new pieces for the soundtrack, Gabriel also used instrumental themes and sections from earlier works to form the basis of some tracks. There were, however, no songs with lyrics on the album.

Recalling his experience of working with Gabriel, Birdy director Alan Parker told Prog magazine in 2010, "We got on so well, he’s such a sweet man. It was such a refreshing change from working with megalomaniacs like Roger Waters. Peter’s record company were very difficult to begin with, and so I phoned them to ask if they’d mind if Peter took a little time to do this, and they said as long as it didn’t take more than a couple of months because Peter was already a year late or something. He had strong views and I would never be able to persuade him to do something he didn’t feel comfortable with, but we didn’t have any confrontation as such."

Reception

Released 18 March 1985, Birdy reached number 51 on the UK Albums Chart and number 162 on the US Billboard 200. The commercial performance exemplified Gabriel's strong cult following, according to biographer Daryl Easlea (2018), adding that the chart peaks are "still pretty impressive for what is essentially an album of sound collages." In their review, Rolling Stone noted the album's prioritisation of "mood over melodic content".

In a retrospective review, Tom Demalon of AllMusic felt the album was a "successful companion piece" to Parker's film, providing a "moody and evocative" backdrop. He noted many of the tracks incorporate threads from Peter Gabriel's fourth album (1982) and warned that the album would disappoint listeners expecting Gabriel's more pop-leaning material, but said "its meditative nature makes it fine, reflective listening for the more adventurous." Steven Grant and Ira Robbins, writing for Trouser Press, also drew attention to the mix of new material and adaptations of earlier recordings, and felt that "[a]lthough it's uncommon to hear sustained instrumental work from someone so known for vocal music, the score is audibly identifiable, and provides a fascinating glimpse into his adaptational thinking." They described it as "[a] strongly affecting work, a major challenge met admirably with style and character."

Colin Larkin described it as a "haunting soundtrack" in The Encyclopedia of Popular Music, whilst in The Great Rock Discography, Martin C. Strong wrote how Gabriel transformed earlier material into "atmospheric mood pieces" with "impressive effect". Birdy was reissued on vinyl in 2017; reviewing the release for Uncut, John Lewis described Birdy as "interesting but fragmentary" but highlighted "Birdy's Flight" for being a heavy, drum-laden instrumental based on "Not One of Us". He also noted the album's significance, saying: "Many of the techniques explored on Birdy – particularly the experiments with ambient sound on 'Dressing the Wound' and 'Sketchpad with Trumpet and Voice' – would lay the groundwork for So, and both projects certainly shared many of the same personnel."

Track listing
All songs written by Peter Gabriel.

Personnel
 Peter Gabriel – keyboards, production
 Jon Hassell – trumpet
 Ekome Dance Company – drums
 Larry Fast – keyboards
 Tony Levin – bass guitar, double bass, backing vocals
 Jerry Marotta – drums, percussion
 David Rhodes – guitar, backing vocals
 Manny Elias – drums
 Morris Pert – drums, percussion
 John Giblin – double bass, bass guitar

Technical personnel
 Greg Fulginiti – mastering
 David Stallbaumer – additional engineering

Charts

In popular culture
The piece "Birdy's Flight" was later used by Hong Kong film director John Woo as part of the score to his A Better Tomorrow films. Other parts of the score were used in Tsui Hark's 1986 movie Peking Opera Blues. The track "The Heat" was used in 1994 Movie Natural Born Killers and in the theatrical trailer of the 1993 movie Tombstone.

References

External links

Peter Gabriel soundtracks
Albums produced by Peter Gabriel
Albums produced by Daniel Lanois
1985 soundtrack albums
Instrumental soundtracks
Charisma Records soundtracks
Geffen Records soundtracks
Ambient albums by English artists
Experimental rock albums by English artists
Sound collage albums